Tom Tutson (born May 20, 1958) is a former American football defensive back. He played for the Atlanta Falcons in 1983.

References

1958 births
Living people
American football defensive backs
South Carolina State Bulldogs football players
Atlanta Falcons players